Michael A. Burlingame is an American historian noted for his works on Abraham Lincoln. He is the Naomi B. Lynn Distinguished Chair in Lincoln Studies at the University of Illinois Springfield.

Early life and education
Burlingame was born in Washington, D.C. and graduated from Phillips Academy in Andover, Massachusetts in 1960. He studied at Princeton University (BA 1964) where he was a Woodrow Wilson Fellow and a Fulbright Scholar. He received a Ph.D. in history from Johns Hopkins University in 1971.

Career
Burlingame was a member of the history department at Connecticut College in New London, Connecticut from 1968 and  until 2001. He joined the faculty of the University of Illinois Springfield in 2009.

Burlingame is a renowned scholar on the life of Abraham Lincoln. He authored The Inner World of Abraham Lincoln (1994) and the two-volume Abraham Lincoln: A Life (2008). The former was said to have launched a new "'golden age' of Lincoln scholarship." The latter won the 2010 Lincoln Prize, was a co-winner of the annual book prize awarded by the Abraham Lincoln Institute, and won the Russell P. Strange Book Award given annually by the Illinois State Historical Society for the best book on Illinois history. Burlingame has edited over a dozen volumes of Lincoln primary source materials. 

Burlingame is a board member and officer of both the Abraham Lincoln Association and Abraham Lincoln Institute. In addition to his awards for Abraham Lincoln: A Life, he has received the Abraham Lincoln Association Book Prize (1996), the Lincoln Diploma of Honor from Lincoln Memorial University (1998), Honorable Mention for the Lincoln Prize, Gettsyburg College (2001), and was inducted as a laureate of The Lincoln Academy of Illinois and awarded the Order of Lincoln (the state’s highest honor) by the Governor of Illinois in 2009 as a Bicentennial Laureate.

Burlingame has charged several Lincoln scholars with plagiarism. In 2000, Burlingame submitted a review to The Journal of American History alleging plagiarism in John C. Waugh's book, Reelecting Lincoln: The Battle for the 1864 Presidency. In the same review, Burlingame also highlighted errors in citation and transcription in Harold Holzer's book, The Lincoln Mailbag: America Writes to the President, 1861-1896. Holzer responded by charging that Burlingame had "riven the Lincoln field, and made it unpleasant to contribute scholarship. He's the Torquemada of academic journalism." In 1993, and again in 2002, Burlingame was involved in the Stephen B. Oates controversy, maintaining Oates plagiarized in his Lincoln biography.

Works

Michael Burlingame, ed. (1998) [1916]. Stevens, Walter B., A Reporter's Lincoln, Lincoln, Nebraska: University of Nebraska Press.
Michael Burlingame, and Ettlinger, John R. Turner, eds. (1999). Inside Lincoln's White House: The Complete Civil War Diary of John Hay, Carbondale, Illinois: Southern Illinois University Press. 
Michael Burlingame, ed. (2000). With Lincoln in the White House: Letters, Memoranda, and other Writings of John G. Nicolay, 1860-1865, Carbondale, Illinois: Southern Illinois University Press. 
Michael Burlingame, ed. (2000) [1890]. Stoddard, William O., Inside the White House in War Times: Memoirs and Reports of Lincoln's Secretary, Lincoln, Nebraska: University of Nebraska Press.
Michael Burlingame, ed. (2002). Thomas, Benjamin P., "Lincoln's Humor" and Other Essays, Champaign, Illinois: University of Illinois Press 
Michael Burlingame, ed. (2003) [1922]. Weik, Jesse W., The Real Lincoln: A Portrait, Lincoln, Nebraska: University of Nebraska Press.  

Lincoln and the Civil War. Concise Lincoln Library. Carbondale and Edwardsville: Southern Illinois University Press. 2011. . Review
Michael Burlingame, ed. (2018). Sixteenth President-in-Waiting: Abraham Lincoln and the Springfield Dispatches of Henry Villard, 1860–1861, Carbondale, Illinois: Southern Illinois University Press. 
Michael Burlingame, ed. (2021). Abraham Lincoln: The Observations of John G. Nicolay and John Hay. Carbondale, Illinois: Southern Illinois University Press. 

An American Marriage: The Untold Story of Abraham Lincoln and Mary Todd. Berkeley and Oakland, CA: Pegasus Books, 2021. 
The Black Man's President: Abraham Lincoln, African Americans, and the Pursuit of Racial Equality. Berkeley and Oakland, CA: Pegasus Books, 2021.

References

External links

Living people
21st-century American historians
21st-century American male writers
Connecticut College faculty
University of Illinois at Springfield faculty
Phillips Academy alumni
Johns Hopkins University alumni
Historians of the United States
Lincoln Prize winners
Year of birth missing (living people)
Historians of Abraham Lincoln
American male non-fiction writers